Anna Spafford (March 16, 1842 – April 17, 1923), born Anne Tobine Larsen Øglende in Stavanger, Norway, was a Norwegian-American woman who settled in Jerusalem, where she and her husband Horatio Spafford were central in establishing the American Colony there in 1881.

She was a survivor of the sinking of the French passenger steamer Ville du Havre in 1873. Her daughters Anna “Annie” (born June 11, 1862), Margaret Lee “Maggie” (born May 31, 1864), Elizabeth “Bessie” (born June 19, 1868), and Tanetta (born July 24, 1871) were lost in the wreck. Afterwards Anna gave birth to three more children. Her husband, Horatio Spafford wrote the song It Is Well with My Soul after the various tragedies that struck them, which includes the Chicago fire and the loss of their daughters in the sinking of Ville du Havre.

Literature 
Geniesse, Jane Fletcher, American Priestess: The Extraordinary Story of Anna Spafford and the American Colony in Jerusalem, Nan A. Talese (2008) 
Tveit, Odd Karsten, Annas hus, En beretning fra Stavanger til Jerusalem, Cappelen forlag, Oslo (2000)

External links 

 Article from Library of Congress about American Colony and Anna Spafford
 Extensive article about Anna Spafford

1842 births
1923 deaths
People from Stavanger
Norwegian emigrants to the United States